Danbury is a hamlet in Saskatchewan.

Clayton No. 333, Saskatchewan
Unincorporated communities in Saskatchewan
Division No. 9, Saskatchewan